Grace Jividen (born June 12, 1964) is a retired American judoka who competed in the 1992 Summer Olympics.

Early life
Jividen was born in Buffalo, New York and grew up in Dayton, Ohio. She began practicing judo at the age of three. As a child, she remembers watching her two older brothers compete and had a desire to compete as well.

Jividen attended Webster University, M.A.1991, where she obtained a degree in Procurement & Logistics Management.

Competition
Jividen first competed at a national level in 1978. She made the US National Team in 1981 at the US Olympic Festival, where she received a bronze medal. She would go on to compete in the 1992 Summer Olympics, the first year female judoka were awarded medals. She tied for 7th place with Laura Martinel. Jividen was also an alternate in the 1996, 2000, and 2004 Olympics.

Personal life
Jividen resides in Littleton, Colorado, where she owns and operates Gracie Judo Club. The club teaches both children and adults, and focuses specifically on physical development, character development, competition techniques, and self-defense.

References

American female judoka
Living people
Olympic judoka of the United States
Judoka at the 1992 Summer Olympics
1964 births
Pan American Games medalists in judo
Pan American Games bronze medalists for the United States
Sambokas at the 1983 Pan American Games
Judoka at the 1995 Pan American Games
Medalists at the 1995 Pan American Games
21st-century American women
20th-century American women